ETB Schwarz-Weiß (in English: ETB Black-White), for sponsorship reasons named ETB Wohnbau Baskets, is a professional basketball club based in Essen, Germany. ETB plays its home games in the Sportpark am Hallo.

Players

Current roster

Notable players

Honours
ProB
Winners (1): 2007–08

External links
ETB Wohnbau Baskets

References 
 

Basketball teams in Germany
Basketball teams established in 1960
Essen
Sport in Essen
Schwarz-Weiß Essen
Sport in North Rhine-Westphalia